The following is a list of crime-related publications.

Academic journals 
 Crime & Delinquency (published by SAGE Publishing)
 Crime and Justice (published by University of Chicago Press)
 Crime, Law and Social Change (published by Springer Science+Business Media)
 Crime Science (published by Springer Science+Business Media)
 International Journal of Law, Crime and Justice (published by Elsevier)
 Journal of Crime and Justice (published by Taylor & Francis)
 Journal of Criminal Justice (published by Elsevier)
 Journal of Research in Crime and Delinquency (published by SAGE Publishing)
 The British Journal of Criminology (published by Oxford University Press)
 The Howard Journal of Crime and Justice (published by Wiley)

Government publications 
 Bureau of Justice Statistics Publications
 National Institute of Justice Publications
 Office for Victims of Crime Publications

References 

Works about crime
crime